4-Bromophenylacetic acid, also known as p-bromophenylacetic acid, is an organic compound. It is a derivative of phenylacetic acid containing a bromine atom in the para position.

Preparation
4-Bromophenylacetic acid may be prepared by the addition of a bromine atom to phenylacetic acid through electrophilic aromatic substitution. It was first prepared in the laboratory by treatment of phenylacetic acid with bromine and mercuric oxide; a mixture of the 2- and 4- isomers is made, and the 4- isomer is isolated by fractional crystallization.

It can also be made by condensing 4-bromobenzylbromide with sodium cyanide in ethanol, and the hydrolising the nitrile with sodium hydroxide.

Reactions
Methyl 2-(4-bromophenyl)acetate is made from 4-bromophenylacetic acid by refluxing it with methanol acidified with sulfuric acid.

An ethyl ester can be made in an analogous way.

A hydrazone derivative, 2-(4-bromophenyl)acetohydrazide, is made by refluxing the methyl ester with hydrazine. Further hydrazone derivatives of 4-bromophenylacetic acid are made by condensing the simple hydrazone with aldehydes, forming a double bond with the second nitrogen. At least 19 of these hydrazones are known.

4-Bromophenylacetic acid is a chemical that can be purchased.

Plant protoplasts conjugate aspartic acid with 4-bromophenylacetic acid to form 4-bromophenylacetyl-L-aspartic acid.

4-Bromophenylacetic acid reacts with sodium tetraphenylborate to form felbinac which can be further converted to xenbucin.

Properties
The ionic conductance has been measured.

See also
Phenylacetic acid

References 

Phenylacetic acids
Bromoarenes